G. acaulis may refer to:
 Gaillardia acaulis, a rubberweed species in thegenus Gaillardia
 Gentiana acaulis, a small gentian species
 Gesneria acaulis, a woody shrub species in the genus Gesneria